Whittingham railway station served the village of Whittingham, Northumberland, England from 1887 to 1953 on the Cornhill Branch.

History 
The station opened on 5 September 1887 by the North Eastern Railway. It was situated on the north side of an unnamed road and immediately west of the junction at the A697. The station had five sidings on the west side, one serving a goods shed, three serving a goods platform and the last one serving a coal drop and a weighbridge.

The station closed to passengers on 22 September 1930 and to goods traffic on 2 March 1953.

Despite there being no passenger service the station site was host to a LNER camping coach from 1935 to 1939 and may have had a coach visiting in 1934 and 1935. Camping coach residents were transported to and from the coach in a passenger carriage attached to parcels trains.

In 2009 the station was bought by a private individual, in order to transform it into his residence. The work of restoration was documented in the episode "Victorian Railway Station" of the television series The Restoration Man. By 2016 the restoration work is still going.

References 

Disused railway stations in Northumberland
Former North Eastern Railway (UK) stations
Railway stations in Great Britain opened in 1887
Railway stations in Great Britain closed in 1930
1887 establishments in England
1953 disestablishments in England